Stenocereus stellatus is a  flowering plant in the family Cactaceae that is found in Oaxaca, Mexico

Gallery

References

External links
 
 

stellatus
Flora of Mexico